Sherpur-1 is a constituency represented in the Jatiya Sangsad (National Parliament) of Bangladesh since 1996 by Atiur Rahman Atik of the Awami League.

Boundaries 
The constituency encompasses Sherpur Sadar Upazila.

History 
The constituency was created in 1984 from a Mymensingh constituency when the former Mymensingh District was split into four districts: Mymensingh, Sherpur, Netrokona, and Kishoreganj.

Members of Parliament

Elections

Elections in the 2010s

Elections in the 2000s

Elections in the 1990s

References

External links
 

Parliamentary constituencies in Bangladesh
Sherpur District